Alistair Douglas Ross Campbell (born 23 September 1972) is a retired Zimbabwean cricketer and a former captain of the Zimbabwe national cricket team. He is also a cricket commentator. In total he played 60 matches in his Test career, captaining Zimbabwe on 21 occasions. He also played 188 One Day Internationals, being captain in 86 of them. He retired from cricket in 2003.

Domestic career
Born in Salisbury (now Harare), Campbell started his cricketing career as early as in school times in Eaglesvale High School, and was selected for the national side while he was still at the school. He scored his maiden first-class century by becoming the youngest Zimbabwean to do so.

International career

Early career
A left-handed batsman, Campbell batted in the middle order in Test cricket but usually opened in One Day International cricket. After becoming the youngest ever Zimbabwean to make a first-class century he was selected for the 1992 World Cup in Australia, aged 19. He struggled throughout but in the coming years managed to cement his spot in the national side. On the 1993–94 Pakistan tour he scored 3 half centuries against the likes of Wasim Akram and Waqar Younis.

In October 1994 he fell painfully short of his maiden Test century when he was dismissed by Sri Lankan paceman Ravindra Pushpakumara for 99. This remained his highest Test score for five years until he brought up 3 figures against India at Nagpur in 2000–01. He scored one more Test century in his career, an innings of 103 the following season against the West Indies.

He was more successful in the ODI arena, making over 5000 runs and maintaining an average of over 30. His most prolific year was in 2000 when he made 960 runs at 38.40. Of his 7 hundreds, 2 were made against Australia.

Captaincy
Campbell took over the captaincy of Zimbabwe in 1996. He led them to a series victory in Pakistan in 1998–99, and also led the team to the Super Six stage of the 1999 World Cup. After 3 years in charge he stood down from the captaincy for what he stated as 'personal reasons'.

In the 1998 inaugural ICC Knockout Trophy (now renamed as ICC Champions Trophy), Campbell became the first batsman to score a century.

Post captaincy
After not being selected for the 2003 World Cup, Campbell announced his retirement from international cricket only to reconsider when he was chosen to replace an injured Mark Vermeulen. Zimbabwe's final match of the World Cup turned out to be the final match of Campbell's career as he was never selected again for his country.

In July 2009, Campbell was re-inducted into Zimbabwe cricket after being selected chairman of their Cricket Committee, a major step in the revival of the sport in the nation. He is also the chief selector of the Zimbabwean national cricket team.

After cricket
Campbell worked as a selector in the cricket administration of Zimbabwe, where he resigned from the position in October 2011. He also resigned as chair of the cricket committee in 2012.

In 2015, he was appointed as the managing director of Zimbabwe Cricket, by replacing Wilfred Mukondiwa. However, in July of the same year, Zimbabwean allrounder Prosper Utseya criticized Campbell's actions as the chairman, alleging that he was a victim of racism because of these actions. Due to these incidents, Campbell resigned from the chairman role as Zimbabwe Cricket's director of international cricket and commercial affairs on 22 October 2015.

References

External links
 

1972 births
Cricketers from Harare
White Zimbabwean sportspeople
Living people
Alumni of Eaglesvale High School
Manicaland cricketers
Mashonaland cricketers
Zimbabwean ODI captains
Zimbabwe One Day International cricketers
Zimbabwe Test cricket captains
Zimbabwe Test cricketers
Zimbabwean cricketers
Commonwealth Games competitors for Zimbabwe
Cricketers at the 1998 Commonwealth Games
Cricketers at the 1992 Cricket World Cup
Cricketers at the 1996 Cricket World Cup
Cricketers at the 1999 Cricket World Cup
Cricketers at the 2003 Cricket World Cup
Wicket-keepers
Zimbabwean cricket commentators